Asaphis is a genus of bivalves belonging to the family Psammobiidae.

The genus has almost cosmopolitan distribution.

Species:

Asaphis deflorata 
Asaphis undulata 
Asaphis violascens 
Asaphus delicatus

References

Psammobiidae
Bivalve genera